Snoopy Island, also called Snoopy Rock (because of the resemblance to the cartoon character Snoopy lying on his back) is a small rocky island off the northern coast of the Emirate of Fujairah (United Arab Emirates) on the Gulf of Oman. The Arabic name is derived from the coastal town of Al Aqah (العقة) and is thus Jazirat al-'Aqqa (جزيرة العقة).  The common English name is also used in the Arabic spelling, Jazirat Snubi (جزيرة سنوبي). GeoNames has the name Jazīrat al Ghubbah (the Arabic equivalent would be ), which is otherwise also rarely used. On the nautical chart there is the entry Jaz al Ghubbah (19), where the number in brackets stands for the altitude in meters.

References

Islands of the United Arab Emirates
Geography of the Emirate of Fujairah